Naim Qassem (born 1953) is a Shia Lebanese cleric and politician, who was the second-in-command of Hezbollah with the title of deputy secretary-general.

Early life and education
Qassem was born into a Shiite family in Kfar Fila in 1953. He studied theology and his teacher was Ayatollah Mohammad Hussein Fadlallah. He also received a bachelor's degree in chemistry from Lebanese University.

Career
Qassem was one of the founders of Lebanese Muslim students union that was established in the 1970s. He joined the Amal movement when it was headed by Imam Musa Sadr. Qassem was the head of the Islamic religious education association from 1974 to 1988. He also served as the advisor for al Mustafa schools. Then Qassem participated in foundation activities of Hezbollah and was appointed deputy secretary-general of Hezbollah in 1992.

Works and views
In 2009, Mustafa Badr Al Din replaced Imad Mughniyah as the head of Hezbollah's military activities. However, Qassem did not support it, favoring his relative Samir Shehade.

Qassem published a book, Hezbollah: The Story from Within, in 2006. On 1 August 2011, Qassem attended a ceremony for the eighth edition of his book, where he made the statement that "Billions of dollars have been offered to us to rebuild the deprived south Lebanon and in return to surrender our arms and stop the work of the resistance. But we told them we're not in need [of their money] and the resistance will go on regardless of 
the consequences."

References

External links

1953 births
Living people
Lebanese University alumni
Hezbollah members
Israeli–Lebanese conflict
Anti-Zionism
Amal Movement politicians
Lebanese writers